Szadek may refer to the following places:
Szadek, Gmina Blizanów in Greater Poland Voivodeship (west-central Poland)
Szadek, Gmina Ceków-Kolonia in Greater Poland Voivodeship (west-central Poland)
Szadek in Łódź Voivodeship (central Poland)